Charles Hamilton Aide (sometimes written as Aidé or Aïdé; 4 November 1826 – 13 December 1906) was "for many years a conspicuous figure in London literary society, a writer of novels, songs and dramas of considerable merit and popularity, and a skillful amateur artist". In particular, Aide was "known for such widely anthologized lyrics as 'Love, the Pilgrim', 'Lost and Found' and 'George Lee'".

Biography
Aide was born in Paris, France. His father, an Armenian merchant, was killed in a duel when Aide was four years old. He was thereafter raised in England by his mother, who was the daughter of British Admiral George Collier. Aide attended the University of Bonn, then served in the British army seven years  until 1853, attaining the rank of captain.

A lifelong bachelor, Aide lived in Lyndhurst with his mother. After her death in 1875, he then "took rooms at Queen Anne's Gate where he hosted a celebrated salon which drew 'the chief figures in the social and artistic world of France as well as England'". He was one of the male companions of Henry James, who characterised him as "the Diane de Poitiers of our time".

He died in London, leaving his papers to Morton Fullerton.

Legacy
His entry in the Dictionary of National Biography sets forth that Aide was:

Aide left his papers to American author Morton Fullerton, then a correspondent for The Times in their Paris office, with open-ended instructions "to manipulate, to publish, or to burn as you think fit". His estate was sworn at  £43,000 gross. His remaining literary copyrights were bequeathed to Lady Stanley.

References

External links

 
 
Hamilton Aïdé Papers. General Collection of Books and Manuscripts. Beinecke Rare Book and Manuscript Library.

1826 births
1906 deaths
British people of Armenian descent
English dramatists and playwrights
People from Lyndhurst, Hampshire
Writers from Paris
French male dramatists and playwrights
English male novelists
French male novelists
19th-century English novelists
19th-century British dramatists and playwrights
19th-century English male writers